James Rowlands is the name of:

James Rowlands (footballer), English footballer
James Rowlands (politician), British politician

See also
James Rowland (disambiguation)